Ivan Marinov (born August 7, 1968) is a Bulgarian sprint canoer who competed in the late 1980s. He won a bronze medal in the K-4 500 m event at the 1989 ICF Canoe Sprint World Championships in Plovdiv. 

At the 1988 Summer Olympics in Seoul, Marinov competed in the K-4 1000 m event, but was eliminated in the semifinals.

References

Sports-reference.com profile

1968 births
Bulgarian male canoeists
Canoeists at the 1988 Summer Olympics
Living people
Olympic canoeists of Bulgaria
ICF Canoe Sprint World Championships medalists in kayak